Valjala Parish (or Valjala rural municipality) was a rural municipality in western Estonia. It is a part of Saare County. The municipality had a population of 1,397 (as of 1 January 2006) and covered an area of 180.02 km².

During the administrative-territorial reform in 2017, all 12 municipalities on the island Saaremaa were merged into a single municipality – Saaremaa Parish.

Location 
Valjala Parish was situated between Laimjala Parish (east), Pihtla Parish (west) and Leisi Parish (north).

Villages and boroughs 
The parish consisted of one small borough, Valjala, and 32 villages:
Ariste, Jursi, Jõelepa, Jööri, Kalju, Kallemäe, Kalli, Kogula, Koksi, Kuiste, Kungla, Kõnnu, Kõriska, Lööne, Männiku, Nurme, Oessaare, Põlluküla, Rahu, Rannaküla, Röösa, Sakla, Siiksaare, Turja, Tõnija, Undimäe, Vanalõve, Veeriku, Vilidu, Võrsna, Väkra, Väljaküla.

Other features 
The parish had 2 schools, kindergarten, and several manors.

The oldest sacral building in Estonia is Valjala church.  The construction began in 1227.

Parish included ruins of ancient Valjala Stronghold.

See also 
 Municipalities of Estonia

References

External links 
  (available only in Estonian).